Statistics of the Yemeni League in the 2006–07 season.

Final table

External links
 

Yemeni League seasons
Yem
1